Ali Qeshlaqi, also rendered as Ali Qeshlaq, may refer to:
 Ali Qeshlaqi, Ardabil
 Ali Qeshlaqi, East Azerbaijan